The 2019–20 North Caledonian Football League (known for sponsorship reasons as the Macleod & MacCallum North Caledonian League) was the 111th season of the North Caledonian Football League. The season began on 7 September 2019 and was declared void due to the COVID-19 pandemic in Scotland on 18 May 2020. Golspie Sutherland were the defending champions. Alness United entered a period of abeyance and therefore will not play in the league from this season onwards though the number of entrants remained at nine as Bonar Bridge were reformed for the start of the season.

Teams

League table at time of abandonment

References

External links

North Caledonian Football League seasons
North Caledonian Football League